Asif Mumtaz (born 3 October 1988) is a Pakistani cricketer. He made his first-class debut for Rawalpindi in the 2009–10 Quaid-e-Azam Trophy on 3 December 2009. He made his List A debut for Rawalpindi Rams in the 2010-11 National One Day Championship on 30 January 2011.

References

External links
 

1988 births
Living people
Pakistani cricketers
Cricketers from Sialkot